Liyu may refer to:

 Asian carp, known as Liyu in Chinese
 Liyu Lake, a lake in Hualien County, Taiwan named after the carp
 Liyu Subdistrict (栗雨街道), a subdistrict of Tianyuan District, Zhuzhou, Hunan, China
 Liyu, Fujian (峛屿), a town in Yunxiao County, Fujian, China
 Liyu (monarch) , a king in the historic Ming dynasty tributary state of Caboloan, in what is now Philippines
 Liyu police, a police unit established by the Somali regional government as a counter-terrorism force -See Oromo–Somali clashes

See also
 Li Yu (disambiguation)